Caladenia helvina, commonly known as the summer spider orchid, is a plant in the orchid family Orchidaceae and is endemic to Tasmania. It is a ground orchid with a single hairy leaf and usually a single greenish-yellow to pale yellow flower with reddish teeth on the sides of the labellum and reddish calli along its mid-line.

Description
The sepals and petals are linear in shape near their base but suddenly taper after about one-third of their length to a narrow, thread-like glandular tail. The lateral sepals are a similar size and shape to the dorsal sepal and the petals are slightly shorter and narrower. Flowering occurs from December to January.

Taxonomy and naming
Caladenia helvina was first formally described by David Jones in 1991 and the description was published in Australian Orchid Research. The specific epithet (helvina) is a Latin word meaning "yellowish" or "pale yellow", referring to the colour of the flowers of this orchid.

Distribution and habitat
Summer spider orchid is widespread in Tasmania where it grows in forest in shallow, sometimes stony soil.

References

helvina
Plants described in 1991
Endemic orchids of Australia
Orchids of Tasmania
Taxa named by David L. Jones (botanist)